The inker (sometimes credited as the finisher or embellisher) is one of the two line artists in traditional comic book production.

The penciller creates a drawing, the inker outlines, interprets, finalizes, retraces this drawing by using a pencil, pen or a brush. Inking was necessary in the traditional printing process as presses could not reproduce pencilled drawings. "Inking" of text is usually handled by another specialist, the letterer,
the application of colors by the colorist.

As the last hand in the production chain before the colorist, the inker has the final word on the look of the page, and can help control a story's mood, pace, and readability.

Workflow 

While inking can involve tracing pencil lines in a literal sense, it also requires interpreting the pencils, giving proper weight to the lines, correcting mistakes, and making other creative choices. The look of a penciler's final art can vary enormously depending on the inker. A pencil drawing can have an infinite number of shades of grey, depending on the hardness of the graphite and the pressure applied by the artist. By contrast, an ink line generally can be only solid black. Accordingly, the inker has to translate pencil shading into patterns of ink, as for example by using closely spaced parallel lines, feathering, or cross-hatching.

Some inkers will often do more than simply interpret the pencil markings into pen and brush strokes; depending on how much detail the penciler puts into the pencil drawings, the inker might add shading or be responsible for the placement of black spaces and shadows in the final drawing. An experienced inker paired with a novice penciler might be responsible for correcting anatomical or other mistakes, modifying facial expressions, or changing or improving the artwork in a variety of other ways. Alternatively, an inker may do the basic layout of the page, give the work to another artist to do more detailed pencil work, and then ink the page himself (as Joe Simon often did when inking Jack Kirby, or when Michael T. Gilbert collaborated with penciler P. Craig Russell on the Elric of Melniboné series).

The division between penciler and inker described here is most frequently found where the penciler and inker are hired independently of each other by the publisher. Where an artist instead hires his own assistants, the roles are less structured; an artist might, for example, ink all the faces of the characters while leaving the assistant to ink in the backgrounds, or work with the inker in a more collaborative fashion. Neal Adams' Crusty Bunkers worked like this, with say one inker responsible for the characters' heads, another doing bodies, and a third embellishing backgrounds. The inking duo Akin & Garvey had a similar arrangement, with one inking the figures and the other the backgrounds.

Digital inking 
One can ink digitally using computers, a practice that has started to become more common as inkers learn to use powerful drawing and editing tools such as Adobe Illustrator and Photoshop, Inkscape, Corel Painter, and Manga Studio. A graphics tablet is the most common tool used to accurately ink digitally, and use of vector-based programs precludes pixelization due to changes in resolution. However, many regard the process as more time-consuming.

 some companies put scanned pencils on an FTP site. The inker downloads them, prints them in blue, inks the pages, scans them in and loads the finished pages back on the FTP site for the company to download. While this procedure saves a company time and shipping costs, it requires artists to spend money for computer equipment.

History 

For a long time, inking was considered a minor part of the comics industry, only marginally above lettering in the pecking order. In the early days of comic books, many publishers hired "packagers" to produce entire books. Although some "star" creators' names (such as Simon and Kirby or Bob Kane) usually appeared at the beginning of each story, the publisher generally didn't care which artists worked on the book. In the early days, the creator of the feature would get credit for as long as he worked on the feature, but when he was replaced by other artists, no name credit would be given to them. Packagers instituted an assembly line style method of creating books, using top talents like Kirby to create the look and pace of the story and then handing off the inking, lettering, and coloring to largely anonymous — and low-paid — creators to finish it.

Deadline pressures and a desire for consistency in the look of a feature led to having one artist pencil a feature while one or more other artists inked it. At Marvel Comics, where the pencil artist was responsible for the frame-by-frame breakdown of the story plot, an artist who was skilled in story-telling would be encouraged to do as many books as possible, maximizing the number of books he could do by leaving the inking to others. By contrast, at other companies where the writer did the frame-by-frame breakdown in script form, more artists inked or even lettered their own work. Joe Kubert, Jim Aparo and Alex Toth would usually pencil, ink and letter, considering the placing of word balloons as an integral part of the page, and artists such as Bill Everett, Steve Ditko, Kurt Schaffenberger, Murphy Anderson, and Nick Cardy almost always inked their own work (and sometimes the work of other pencilers as well). Most artists, however — even experienced inkers of their own work like Lou Fine, Reed Crandall, Will Eisner, and Alex Toth — at times hired or allowed other artists to ink their drawings. Some artists could make more money by pencilling more pages and leaving the inking to others; different artists with different working methods might find it more profitable to both pencil and ink, as they could place less information and detail in the pencil drawings if they were inking it themselves and could put that detail in at the inking stage.

Due to the absence of credits on most Golden Age comic books, many inkers of that period are largely forgotten. For those whose names are known, it is difficult to compile résumés. Inkers like Chic Stone, George Papp, and Marvin Stein embellished thousands of pages during that era, most of which are still unidentified.

In the early 1960s, Marvel Comics began giving the inker credit in each of their publications and other publishers began to follow suit. This allowed finishers like Dick Ayers, Joe Sinnott, Mike Esposito, John Severin, Syd Shores, and Tom Palmer to earn a reputation as inkers as well as pencillers. In addition, penciller-inker teams like Kirby and Sinnott, Curt Swan and Murphy Anderson, Gene Colan and Palmer, and John Byrne and Terry Austin captured the attentions of comic book fandom.

In 2008 Marvel and DC inker Bob Almond founded the Inkwell Awards, which is an award established to celebrate the craft of inking and to lift the profile of the art in general. The Inkwell Awards has gained much publicity and counts notable inkers such as Joe Sinnott, Nathan Massengill and Tim Townsend as members and associates.

Notable inkers 

 Dan Adkins
 Mike Allred
 Murphy Anderson
 Terry Austin
 Brett Breeding
 Vince Colletta
 Vince Deporter
 Tony DeZuniga
 Mike Esposito
 Joe Giella
 Dick Giordano
 Al Gordon
 Dan Green
 Mark Irwin
 Billy Graham
 Klaus Janson
 George Klein
 Paul Neary
 Kevin Nowlan
 Tom Palmer
 Jimmy Palmiotti
 Branko Plavšić
 Josef Rubinstein
 Joe Sinnott
 Alex Toth
 Frank Frazetta
 Al Williamson
 Frank Miller
 Bob Smith
 Karl Story
 Art Thibert
 Rade Tovladijac
 Dexter Vines
 Scott Williams
 Al Williamson
 Wally Wood

Notable penciller–inker partnerships 
 Curt Swan/George Klein — Worked for decades on DC's Superman titles. Commander R. A. Benson, USN (Ret.) wrote "[I]t was Swan with Klein who created the definitive Superman image [that] typified the Silver Age".
 Curt Swan/Murphy Anderson — Notably on the early 1970s Superman titles, the team is often referred to as "Swanderson."
 Jack Kirby/Joe Simon — possibly the first true tandem, in their heydey they defined Captain America, The Red Skull, Sandman and Sandy, Manhunter, the Boy Commandos, romance comics, and much more.
 John Severin/Will Elder - EC war and science fiction
 Jack Kirby/Dick Ayers — Ayers probably being Kirby's most prolific partner, the pair produced hundreds of pages of Western and monster stories before the Marvel superhero era began.
 Jack Kirby/Joe Sinnott — the early years of the Fantastic Four
 Ross Andru/Mike Esposito — the pair worked together on-and-off for over 40 years, for DC and Marvel, on such titles as Showcase, Wonder Woman, the Metal Men, and The Amazing Spider-Man
 Dick Ayers/John Severin — Sgt. Fury
 Gene Colan/Syd Shores — 1960s Daredevil
 John Buscema/Tom Palmer — 1960s Avengers
 Neal Adams/Tom Palmer — late 1960s X-Men and Avengers
 Neal Adams/Dick Giordano — late 1960s/early 1970s era Batman, Detective Comics, and Green Lantern/Green Arrow
 Gene Colan/Tom Palmer —Daredevil, Tomb of Dracula, Doctor Strange
 John Byrne/Terry Austin — a run on the Uncanny X-Men
 Frank Miller/Klaus Janson — Daredevil and Batman: The Dark Knight Returns
 George Pérez/Romeo Tanghal — the New Teen Titans
 Ron Frenz/Brett Breeding - many projects but most notably late 1980s The Amazing Spider-Man, Thor, and late 1990s Avengers Next
 Stephen R. Bissette/John Totleben — Alan Moore's Swamp Thing
 Jim Lee/Scott Williams — Uncanny X-Men, WildCATS, and All Star Batman and Robin the Boy Wonder
 Joe Quesada/Jimmy Palmiotti — many projects, notably Ash and Daredevil
 Ed McGuinness/Dexter Vines — known as "eDex," they've partnered on (among others) Civil War, Superman/Batman, and JLA Classified
 Bryan Hitch/Paul Neary — Known for their run on "The Ultimates", written by Mark Millar.
 Greg Capullo/Danny Miki — Known for their run on Todd McFarlane's "Spawn (comics)" in the mid 1990s.
 Jan Duursema/Dan Parsons — Known for Dark Horse Star Wars comics "Republic","Legacy", and"Dawn of the Jedi" in the early 2000s.

See also 
 Script (comics)
 Penciller
 Letterer
 Colorist

References

External links 
 Atlas Comics (retailer). "The 20 Greatest Inkers of American Comics Books"
 Brevoort, Tom. "What an Inker does", Marvel.com (June 19, 2007)

Visual arts occupations
 
Comics terminology